Notre-Dame-des-Bois is a municipality in Le Granit Regional County Municipality in the Estrie region of Quebec, Canada, on the Canada–United States border. The population was 1,028 as of the Canada 2021 Census.

Located in the Appalachians, it lies at 555 metres in altitude, making it one of the highest towns in Quebec. Mont-Mégantic National Park is located in Notre-Dame-des-Bois and is one of the biggest tourism draws to the region.

Sources

Commission de toponymie du Québec
Ministère des Affaires municipales, des Régions et de l'Occupation du territoire

External links

Municipalities in Quebec
Incorporated places in Estrie
Le Granit Regional County Municipality